Remember To Rise subtitled Black's Dream is a derivative work of the Iyasile Naa, a massive art collaboration. Observing innovation in developing countries, technologist of Ijebu descent Ade Abayomi Olufeko, known for his collective signature created the work as a cultural bequest for the African continent.

Described as a polymath by Vanguard for his international work, Olufeko teamed up with the African business club at the London Business School, during its summit which held at the Landmark hotel, he introduced the digital painting parallel to his attendance and guest moderation of a social cultural panel that featured high-profile personalities.

Background

The art piece evolved as an expression and active statement to the intellectual elite, in context of highlighting economic bubbles, fragmentation, and ethnocentrism towards the continent from its diaspora. Remember To Rise serves as a nonpolitical symbol and a call to action towards the youth, encouraging the expansion beyond the rapid dominance of general pop culture and African music on the world stage. The collaboration between Olufeko and the club at the business school leveraged the attendance of renowned public figures by their respective fields.

Artwork, title and construction 
In context of economic cause and effect, observing the activities of several industries on the Intra-trade in Africa, the title of Remembering To Rise; Black's Dream came to fruition. The artwork is an abstract painting that shows researched data guided by geometric shapes, and displays arabic calligraphy excerpts by the famous poet Rumi. It also displays permanent markers, scattered citrine clusters with acrylic powder glitter on heavy-coated paper, making the classification of the artwork mixed media. 

Showcasing the breath of African culture, the framing of the artwork in Zellige motifs is accompanied with Amazigh and berber languages. Adding to the practice of inclusion across the sub-Sahara, the final assembling was done in the Ojuelegba community. The abstract aspects of Remember To Rise is inspired by astronomical star Eta Carinae.

Notable signatures 
The following is a list of persons at and outside the summit who signed the artwork as of 2018.

Personnel 
Various persons part of the Remember To Rise project.

London Business School
Soji Solanke - 2018 African Club Co-President
Amine Bendriss - 2018 African Club Co-President
Elena Zhukova - 2018 African Club Conference Chair

Production
R. Sibaoueih - Artist team 
Wonu Talabi - Artist assisting team (Conference) 
Abdellatif Abdul - Amazigh, Arabic and berber linguist

See also
African Renaissance
Iyasile Naa, painting

References 

Economics of the arts and literature
2018 paintings
Moroccan art
Nigerian art
Digital artworks